Philip Stanhope (2 May 1732 – 16 November 1768) was the illegitimate son of Philip Stanhope, 4th Earl of Chesterfield, to whom the famous Letters to His Son were addressed. His mother was a French governess, Madelina Elizabeth du Bouchet.

Career 
Despite his father taking great pains to educate him and using his influence to obtain various diplomatic appointments for what he hoped would be a high-flying career, Stanhope was treated with disdain by many because of his illegitimacy. He was a Member of Parliament for Liskeard and St Germans.  The government in 1764 wished to get possession of his seat, asked him to vacate it, and after some negotiation agreed on receiving a payment of £1,000, which was half the amount that he (or his father) had paid for it. He was also successively Resident at Hamburg (1752–59) and Envoy Extraordinary to the Diet of Ratisbon, (1763) and on 3 April 1764, he was finally appointed to the Court of Dresden, Saxony.

Family 
Stanhope had met his wife, Eugenia Peters, in Rome in the spring of 1750 while on the Grand Tour. He was just 18, and she 20. Believed incorrectly by many to be the illegitimate daughter of an Irish gentleman by the name of Domville, Eugenia was described by one observer as "plain almost to ugliness" but possessing "the most careful education and all the choicest accomplishments of her sex". Her mother was noted, however, to have been "a true English goody, vulgar and unbred." Stanhope and Eugenia's two sons, Charles and Philip, were born in London in 1761 and 1763 respectively, and it was not until 25 September 1767 that he and Eugenia were married in Dresden. Stanhope went to great lengths to keep the relationship a secret from his father to the extent of engaging a separate habitation for his wife and children.

He had never lived up to the expectations of his father since he was unable by temperament or choice to acquire the graces that his father had tried so hard to impart. He did not rise as expected in the diplomatic services and preferred instead an unpretentious domestic life. Often in ill health, he died of dropsy in St Gervais, France, on 16 November 1768, aged only 36, and is buried at Vaucluse. It was generally believed that only after the death of his beloved son that Lord Chesterfield learned of the existence of Philip's wife and children. He received them kindly and took upon himself the cost of education and maintenance of his grandsons and became very attached to them.

When Lord Chesterfield died in 1773, his will caused much gossip. He provided for the two grandsons with £100 annuity each, as well as £10,000, but left Eugenia Stanhope nothing. Faced with the problem of supporting herself, she sold Chesterfield's letters to a publisher, J. Dodsley, for 1500 guineas. Chesterfield had never intended them for publication, and the result was a storm of controversy because of their perceived "immorality", which ensured several reprints and their steady sale for at least 100 years. Eugenia died at her home in Limpsfield, Surrey, in 1783 and had acquired property and a comfortable fortune. She also wrote The deportment of a married life: laid down in a series of letters, which was published in 1798.

In a codicil to her will, she directed her sons "to live in strict unity and friendship with one another, not to dissipate their fortunes and to beware of all human beings".

Philip and Eugenia's sons were educated in the law. The elder son Philip married Elizabeth Daniel, had two daughters and died aged 38 in 1801. The survivor of his two daughters, Eugenia Keir, née Stanhope, died at Madeira in 1823, with no surviving issue. The younger son, Charles, died in 1845, aged 83, without issue and bequeathed most of his estate, which included Lord Chesterfield's bequests to both himself and his late brother and his mother's properties, to the sons of Elizabeth Daniel's brother Edward Daniel, barrister-at-law.

Further reading
The Stanhope Legacy: The Story of Lord Chesterfield's Grandsons and the Miserable Fate of their Heirs; Cheryl Nicol

References 

 S. M. Brewer, Design for a Gentleman: The Education of Philip Stanhope (1963)
 Willard Connely, Adventures in Biography: A Chronicle of Encounters and Findings (1960)
 Jenny Davidson, Hypocrisy and the Politics of Politeness: Manners and Morals from Locke to Austen (2004): .
 John Ward, Experiences of a Diplomatist 

1732 births
1768 deaths
British diplomats
Deaths from edema
Members of the Parliament of Great Britain for Liskeard
Members of the Parliament of Great Britain for St Germans
British MPs 1754–1761
British MPs 1761–1768
Philip